Mustapha Naitlhou (born 19 August 1968) is a Moroccan alpine skier. He competed in the men's giant slalom at the 1992 Winter Olympics.

References

1968 births
Living people
Moroccan male alpine skiers
Olympic alpine skiers of Morocco
Alpine skiers at the 1992 Winter Olympics
Place of birth missing (living people)